Higher is the third studio album by Life On Planet 9, the pseudonym for experimental releases for American hard rock band Lo-Pro. It was released on January 31, 2017.

Background 
Lead singer Pete Murray and guitarist Neil Godfrey first began working with each other in the late 1990s for the nu metal band Ultraspank. After two albums, the band disbanded, though the two later started a new hard rock band in the early 2000s, called Lo-Pro. The band released their major record label debut, Lo-Pro in 2003, and despite a top 20 mainstream rock single, "Sunday", the band was dropped from their label. After the split, Murray and Godfrey spent an extended five-year period of working on new material before releasing anything. The band found themselves with some material that was more centralized around acoustic guitar and electronic effects than Lo-Pro's hard rock sound. As such, the band decided to release the Lo-Pro acoustic/electronic sessions under a different moniker; the pseudonym Life On Planet 9. The band finally released their debut album, Bittersweet, in August 2011. and released a second album, The Theory of Everything in 2014.

A third album from the band was first announced on New Year's Eve 2015 with a 2016 release date intended. The first single from the album, "All Your Words", was released on January 6, 2017. The album's name, Higher, was announced a week later on January 13. A release date of January 31, 2017, was announced at the same time.

Track listing

Personnel 
Pete Murray – vocals, electronic programming
Neil Godfrey – guitars

References

External links 

2017 albums
Lo-Pro albums